Nadilu (also Romanized as Nādīlū and Nādīllū) is a village in Qebleh Daghi Rural District of Howmeh District, Azarshahr County, East Azerbaijan province, Iran. At the 2006 census, its population was 3,116 in 821 households. The following census in 2011 counted 3,479 people in 1,030 households. The latest census in 2016 showed a population of 3,436 people in 1,083 households; it was the largest village in its rural district.

References 

Azarshahr County

Populated places in East Azerbaijan Province

Populated places in Azarshahr County